Grace Jung  (born 1987) is a Korean American stand-up comedian, writer, translator and filmmaker. She is the author of the novel Deli Ideology, about a college graduate working in a delicatessen during the recession. She is the host of K-Drama School podcast. She is making her television debut on a new show on TBS.

In 2016, her translation of 벌레 이야기 by Yi Chong-jun was published in Two Stories from Korea: "The Wounded" and "The Abject". Jung has also translated a collection of select short stories by Kim Tongin which was published by Honford Star in 2017 entitled Sweet Potato.

Biography

Jung was born in Busan, South Korea, and immigrated to Brooklyn, New York in 1992. She earned her B.A. in English Literature at Pace University. She has a PhD in Cinema and Media Studies from UCLA. She is a former Fulbright Scholar.

Awards
Academy of American Poets Prize 
Fulbright Research Scholarship

References

External links
 
 Twitter page
 Instagram page
 K-Drama School Podcast

Living people
South Korean emigrants to the United States
Pace University alumni
American writers of Korean descent
People from Busan
1987 births
American comedians of Asian descent
American filmmakers
American women comedians
University of California, Los Angeles alumni
American stand-up comedians